Tough Guy is a 1936 American action film directed by Chester Franklin, written by Florence Ryerson and Edgar Allan Woolf, and starring Jackie Cooper, Joseph Calleia, Rin Tin Tin, Jr., Harvey Stephens, Jean Hersholt, and Edward Pawley. It was released on January 24, 1936, by Metro-Goldwyn-Mayer.

Plot
Young "Freddie" Vincent runs away from home with his faithful dog, Duke. Stowing away in the back of a truck, Freddie and Duke find themselves in the clutches of gangsters.

Cast 
 Jackie Cooper as Freddie, Frederick Martindale Vincent III
 Joseph Calleia as Joe Calerno
 Rin Tin Tin, Jr. as Duke
 Harvey Stephens as Chief Davison
 Jean Hersholt as Doctor
 Edward Pawley as Tony
 Mischa Auer as Chi
 Robert Warwick as Frederick Vincent

Home media
Tough Guy was released on manufactured-on-demand DVD by the Warner Archive Collection on June 14, 2016.

Gallery

References

External links

 
 
 
 

1936 films
American action films
1930s action films
Metro-Goldwyn-Mayer films
Films directed by Chester Franklin
American black-and-white films
Rin Tin Tin
Films with screenplays by Florence Ryerson
Films with screenplays by Edgar Allan Woolf
1930s English-language films
1930s American films